Moses Norris Jr. (November 8, 1799January 11, 1855) was a United States representative and Senator from New Hampshire.

Born in Pittsfield, he attended the public schools and the Pittsfield Academy, and graduated from Dartmouth College in 1828. He studied law, was admitted to the bar in 1832 and commenced practice in Barnstead. He returned to Pittsfield in 1834, was a member of the New Hampshire House of Representatives from 1837 to 1840 and in 1842, and was a member of the Executive Council of New Hampshire in 1841-1842.

Norris was elected as a Democrat to the Twenty-eighth and Twenty-ninth Congresses (March 4, 1843 – March 3, 1847). He was again a member of the State house of representatives in 1847-1848, and served as speaker. He was then elected to the U.S. Senate and served from March 4, 1849, until his death. While in the Senate, he was chairman of the Committee on Claims (Thirty-first Congress) and a member of the Committee on Patents and the Patent Office (Thirty-second Congress) and the Committee on the District of Columbia (Thirty-third Congress). He died in Washington, D.C., in 1855; interment was in Floral Park Cemetery, Pittsfield.

See also
List of United States Congress members who died in office (1790–1899)

References

External links

1799 births
1855 deaths
Democratic Party United States senators from New Hampshire
Democratic Party members of the New Hampshire House of Representatives
New Hampshire lawyers
Dartmouth College alumni
Members of the Executive Council of New Hampshire
Speakers of the New Hampshire House of Representatives
Democratic Party members of the United States House of Representatives from New Hampshire
19th-century American politicians
People from Pittsfield, New Hampshire
19th-century American lawyers